Sulfadicramide (marketed as Irgamid) is an anti-infective.

References

Sulfonamide antibiotics
Alkene derivatives